Zielony Dąb ("green oak") may refer to:
Zielony Dąb, Greater Poland Voivodeship (west-central Poland)
Zielony Dąb, Opole Voivodeship (south-west Poland)